SKA Stadium is a multi-use stadium in Lviv, Ukraine.  It is currently used mostly for football matches, and is the home of FC Karpaty-2 Lviv and FC Lviv. The stadium holds 23,040 spectators.

See also
 Army Sports Club Stadium (Odessa)

External links
Stadium information

References

1967 establishments in Ukraine
Football venues in Lviv